Paulin Tay Straughan (born 8 April 1963) is the dean of students at  Singapore Management University (SMU), where she is also a professor of sociology (practice).

She was an associate professor and vice-dean at the National University of Singapore from 1991 to 2017.

Early life and education 
Straughan was educated at the Convent of the Holy Infant Jesus and Catholic Junior College, before going on to complete a Bachelor of Arts degree in sociology and statistics at the National University of Singapore. She then went on to the University of Virginia in the United States, where she earned a Master of Arts and a PhD in sociology.

Public service 
From 2009 to 2012, Straughan served as a Nominated Member of Parliament (NMP). She received the Public Administration Medal (Bronze), Prime Minister's Office in 2010. On 24 August 2018, Straughan was appointed as one of the 86 Justice of Peace by President of Singapore, Halimah Yacob.

Research 
Straughan has researched on cancer and fatalism, marriage, parenthood and ageing population, and public cleanliness in Singapore.

Selected bibliography

Books 

 Jones, Gavin W.; Straughan, Paulin Tay; and Chan, Angelique Wei Ming (2012). Ultra-low fertility in Pacific Asia: Trends, causes and policy issues. Research Collection School of Social Sciences. Paper 2194. 
 Straughan, Paulin Tay (2011). Towards a cleaner Singapore: Sociological study on littering in Singapore. National Environment Agency. 
 Straughan, Paulin Tay (2009). Marriage dissolution in Singapore: Revisiting family values and ideology in marriage. Leiden: Brill.

Book chapters 

 Straughan, Paulin Tay (2015). Marriage and parenthood in Singapore. In David Chan (Ed.), 50 Years of Social Issues in Singapore (pp. 61–73) Singapore: World Scientific Publishing Company. http://doi.org/10.1142/9789814632621_0004

Articles 

 Feng, Qiushi; Straughan, Paulin Tay (2017). "What does successful aging mean? Lay perception of successful aging among elderly Singaporeans." Journals of Gerontology, Series B, 72 (2), 204-213. http://doi.org/10.1093/geronb/gbw151
 Straughan, Paulin Tay; Seow, Adeline (2000). "Attitudes as barriers in breast screening: a prospective study among Singapore women." Social Science and Medicine, 51 (11), 1695-1703. https://doi.org/10.1016/S0277-9536(00)00086-1
Straughan, Paulin Tay; Seow, Adeline (1998). "Fatalism reconceptualized: A concept to predict health screening behavior." Journal of Gender, Culture, and Health, 3 (2), 85-100. https://doi.org/10.1023/A:1023278230797

References

External links 
 Paulin Tay STRAUGHAN Profile at SMU website
 The accidental academic to varsity dean

Singaporean people of Chinese descent
Singaporean Nominated Members of Parliament
Academic staff of the National University of Singapore
Living people
Catholic Junior College alumni
1963 births
Singaporean women in politics
Singaporean sociologists
Medical sociologists